Thomas Johansson was the defending champion but lost in the quarterfinals to Jarkko Nieminen.

Sjeng Schalken won in the final 3–6, 6–3, 6–3, 4–6, 6–3 against Nieminen.

Seeds

  Lleyton Hewitt (withdrew because of a back injury)
  Sébastien Grosjean (second round)
  Thomas Johansson (quarterfinals)
  Guillermo Cañas (semifinals)
  Thomas Enqvist (semifinals)
  Sjeng Schalken (champion)
  Younes El Aynaoui (second round)
  Wayne Ferreira (quarterfinals)

Draw

Final

Section 1

Section 2

External links
 Main draw 
 Qualifying draw 

Singles
2001 Stockholm Open